Triplophysa brahui is a species of stone loach in the genus Triplophysa. It is found in Baluchistan, Pakistan and in the Helmand River watershed in Afghanistan.

References

B
Fish of Afghanistan
Fish of Pakistan
Fish described in 1912
Taxa named by Erich Zugmayer